Christina Kyi is Burmese film director and film producer. Her 2018 film Mudras Calling was released internationally and screened at thirteen international film festivals in thirteen different countries.

Early life and education 

Christina Kyi was born in Myanmar. At an early age, she moved to the US with her family. She studied filmmaking at the Gibbs College in New York City .

Personal life
She is married to Zenn Kyi, who is best known for his leading role in films Deception (Upe Dan Myin) (2018) and Mudras Calling (2018), Now & Ever (2019). They have two sons, the firstborn son died young and the second son was named Noah.

Filmography

Films
Mudras Calling (2018)
 Deception: Upe Dan Myin (2018)
 Now and Ever (2019)

References

External links

Living people
Burmese film directors
Burmese film producers
University of Yangon alumni
People from Yangon
Year of birth missing (living people)